Pycnocoris is a genus of plant bugs in the family Miridae. There is one described species in Pycnocoris, P. ursinus.

References

Further reading

 
 
 

Miridae genera
Articles created by Qbugbot
Mirini